Efai is an Ibibio-Efik language Oro language of Nigeria.

References

Ibibio-Efik languages
Languages of Nigeria
Oron languages